Chak 118 GB, Jallandhar Sufaid Poshan is a medium-sized village in Tehsil Jaranwala, District Faisalabad.  Chak 118 GB is part of Union Council Number 60, along with other chaks (villages) 56 GB, Chak 114 GB and 170 GB, Chak 115 GB and 116 GB.

Location
It is located approximately 28 km south-east of Faisalabad City and 5 km east of Road Faisalabad - Okara.  Satyana Bungalow is the nearest town (10 km).

Demography
Arain Awan and Rajputs are the major castes of this village.

Education
The village has schools for boys and girls providing education up to 10th standard.  Nearest higher secondary school (up to 12th grade) is located at Chak 72 GB.  For college education of boys and girls, students have to seek admission in colleges at Faisalabad or Jaranwala. Existing schools at the village are:

Government Girls Primary school
Government Boys Primary School
Government Boys High School
Government Girls High School

External links
 Guide Map to Chak 118 GB, Jallandhar Sufaid Poshan
 Village Profile by District Govt Faisalabad

Villages in Faisalabad District